Harold Allan Burt was a professional American football player in the early National Football League for the Cleveland Bulldogs in 1924. He played in only two games for the Bulldogs, and started at guard each time. Prior to his professional career, Burt played at the college level for the Kansas Jayhawks, under coach Potsy Clark. He served as the Jayhawks' captain in 1924. Burt died in Texas in 1979.

References

This is Kansas Football: Kansas History Pages 156-202

1900 births
Players of American football from Kansas
Kansas Jayhawks football players
Cleveland Bulldogs players
1979 deaths
People from Eureka, Kansas